Giles Deacon (born 1969) is a British fashion designer, Creative Director and Founder of Giles Deacon group, a fashion enterprise. Deacon joined the Paris Fashion Week in 2016. Deacon has been known to challenge the traditional ideas of womenswear and often uses wild prints and pop culture references in his designs.
Deacon was employed by the fashion houses Bottega Veneta and Gucci, before founding his own label, GILES, in 2003. He launched his first collection for GILES at the 2004 London Fashion Week and was named "Best New Designer" at the British Fashion Awards.

Deacon's designs have been met with critical acclaim and have sparked a renewed interest in London fashion. Having become one of the fashion industry's most fêted figures, Deacon was named British Fashion Designer of the Year in 2006 and was awarded the French ANDAM Fashion Award's Grand Prix in 2009. The designer was appointed creative director of French fashion house Ungaro in April 2010. Deacon retained the position until September 2011, when he and Ungaro mutually decided to end their collaboration. Deacon launched his first couture collection in 2016 at Paris.

Early life
Deacon was born in Darlington, County Durham, but grew up near Ullswater in the Lake District. Deacon is the youngest child of David, an agricultural salesman, and Judith, a housewife. He has one older sister. He attended Barnard Castle School in County Durham which he credits with instilling in him "the mindset of aesthetics". Alongside schoolmate and friend Glenn Hugill, now a major television executive, he pursued interests in music and film as "portal to other things that we didn't really know about" Deacon initially wanted to become a marine biologist, but he failed his chemistry A-level. He later joined Harrogate College of Arts, where he completed an art foundation course. After completing his course he went on to study at Central St Martins and was in the same class as fashion designers Alexander McQueen and Luella Bartley. He graduated in 1992 and began collaborating on the label 'Doran Deacon' with his friend, Fi Doran as well as contributing illustrations to Dazed & Confused.

Career
Deacon chose to travel and gain experiences at fashion houses, before starting his own label. During his time in Paris, Deacon was hired to work with fashion designer Jean-Charles de Castelbajac, where he learned how to use a brand name commercially. During this time, Deacon met the owner of Italian luxury goods house, Bottega Veneta, and was hired to work for the company, becoming the head designer and debuting an acclaimed collection in 2000. Deacon was dismissed in 2001 when the Gucci group bought the company and terminated his contract, so they could hire German designer, Tomas Maier. However, he was immediately hired by Tom Ford to assist with Gucci womenswear. Deacon was forced to leave Gucci after one season when he became ill from an infected salivary gland.

Once he had recovered, Deacon decided to take out a loan to start his own label and he launched GILES in 2003. He launched his first collection at London Fashion Week in February 2004, styled by his friend Katie Grand, the show saw models Karen Elson, Lily Cole, Eva Herzigova and Linda Evangelista walking the catwalk. The collection received international acclaim and began a renewed interest in London fashion. Deacon regularly showed at London Fashion Week and the GILES collection is bought by over thirty retail stores including Barneys, Harvey Nichols and Selfridges. Deacon counted Thandiwe Newton, Princess Beatrice and Scarlett Johansson among his clients. Several actresses, including Cate Blanchett and Kerry Washington, have worn Deacon's dresses at red carpet events. In 2009, Deacon stated that since he launched his label, he has seen the turnover double every year and sales increased during the recession. His studio is at the Truman Brewery in East London.

In April 2010, it was announced that Deacon had been appointed the creative director position with Ungaro, following the dismissal of Estrella Archs. Deacon became the fifth designer to be hired by the house since it was sold to entrepreneur Asim Abdullah in 2005. On 19 September 2010, Deacon made a return to London Fashion Week, after spending two years showing his collection in Paris. Deacon showed his first collection for Ungaro in October 2010. Vogue previewed the new collection, which was designed by Deacon, styled by Grand and accessorised by Katie Hillier and Stephen Jones, on their website. Vogue reporter, Dolly Jones, described the collection as one of the "most hotly anticipated shows" of the week and she added "[Deacon] looks like he'll be credited with bringing the house of Ungaro back to life, at last."

From June 2011, Deacon took part in the Channel 4 entertainment series, New Look Style the Nation. The designer joined New Look's creative director Barbara Horspool on a panel tasked with finding an "exceptional new fashion stylist" from contestants, who demonstrate good creativity and style. The winner was to be hired by New Look as a stylist. Deacon previously appeared on Britain's Next Top Model as a judge. On 15 September, it was announced Ungaro and Deacon had "mutually decided" to end their collaboration.

In 2013, Deacon presented the first ever fashion exhibition at the William Morris Gallery in London. After deciding to put his ready-to-wear line on hiatus, Deacon launched his first couture collection in 2016. He told Steff Yotka of Vogue that he had always wanted to create more couture pieces, and that he chose to concentrate on high end fashion after realising that the pieces he and his team had produced were selling well.

He designed the wedding dress of Pippa Middleton, sister of Catherine, Princess of Wales, in May 2017.

Style

Deacon has been known to challenge the traditional ideas of womenswear and often uses wild prints and pop culture references in his designs. He has described his designs for GILES as humorous, dark and sexy and has stated that he wants diversity in among them. He said, "My dresses should be worn by young, cool girls just as much as by 55 to 60-year-old women". Deacon often designs "structured big-entrance" dresses, which are aimed at women who want to be noticed. At the 2008 London Fashion Week, Deacon presented a collection with a futuristic theme based on the 1980s arcade game Pac-Man. The character was embellished on many of the dresses and the models wore oversized helmets in the shape of Pac-Man. The designer's New Look menswear collections have been described by GQ magazine as "straddling the line between quirky and wearable".

Susannah Frankel of The Independent has said that Deacon's collections are "a much-needed injection of grand-scale glamour". Frankel added that a playfulness and humour have also found their way into Deacon's collections. In May 2011, Deacon said he does not design for wallflowers and that his collections would always be a "little bit sideways", "quirky" and "British in feel." The Scotsman'' said Deacon's designs are not brash, but "they suit a woman who has the confidence to take centre-stage."

Collaborations
Deacon has worked on many collaborations with companies including Sky, Converse and Evoke, with whom he created his first jewellery collection. In a two-season collaboration with British fashion company Mulberry, Deacon introduced a line of accessories called "Mulberry for Giles", which was both a commercial and critical success. Deacon was then appointed to design for the classic British tailoring label, Daks. He showed his first and second collections for the brand in 2007 and his third in 2008.

Deacon's best known collaboration has been with the High Street fashion chain New Look. The collection called Gold by Giles began in March 2007. On choosing to collaborate with the clothing retailer, Deacon said: "I chose New Look as the high street store to work with, as we both have a sense of fun and believe in fashion for everyone."" Actress Drew Barrymore starred in the first ad campaigns for the collection, following a chance meeting between her and the designer in a lift. British model, Agyness Deyn took over and modelled the key pieces for Deacon's 4th collection.

A lover of chocolate, in 2013 Deacon collaborated with Cadbury’s Caramel Nibbles, creating a couture strapless white tulip Nibbles dress in a chocolate polka-dot print for the Caramel Bunny, complete with ruffle details and a striking pussy-bow neck tie to match. In addition to this, he created a limited edition scarf combining the Cadbury Caramel Bunny’s eyes with coloured chains and pink bows.

In late 2015, Deacon designed a womenswear collection for Debenhams. The collection titled Giles Deacon for Edition was modelled by Daisy Lowe and featured "beautiful dresses, bold prints and luxe outerwear".

Recognition
In 2004, Deacon was named Best New Designer at the British Fashion Awards and in the following year he was given the Young Designer Award at Elle magazine's Style Awards. 2006 saw Deacon win the British Fashion Council's Fashion Forward Award, as well as being named British Fashion Designer of the Year at the British Fashion Awards. He was named Best British Designer at the 2007 Elle Style Awards. Two years later, Deacon won the French ANDAM Fashion Award's Grand Prix, becoming the second consecutive British designer to win the award following Gareth Pugh's win in 2008. In the same year, he was named GQ magazine's Designer of the Year.

Personal life
Deacon divides his time between his home in Islington, London, and his apartments in Paris and Italy. He has been in a relationship with actress Gwendoline Christie since early 2013.

Deacon's hobbies include swimming, hiking, macramé, and gardening. He counts Elsa Schiaparelli, Miuccia Prada, Coco Chanel, Mr J.M. Millet, and Yves Saint Laurent among his design and style inspirations.

References

External links

English fashion designers
1969 births
Alumni of Central Saint Martins
Living people
People educated at Barnard Castle School
Fashion stylists
People from Barnard Castle